Claire Johnston may refer to:
 Claire Johnston (film theorist)
 Claire Johnston (musician)
 Claire Johnston (bowls)

See also
 Claire Johnstone, Scottish footballer